The Greatest Hits is the first compilation album by the English girl group Atomic Kitten. It was released by Innocent Records and Virgin Records on 5 April 2004 in the United Kingdom, following the announcement of their disbandment. Containing all of the group's chart hits from their first three studio albums Right Now (2000), Feels So Good (2002) and Ladies Night (2003), it reached the top five of the UK Albums Chart and number eight in New Zeland. "Someone like Me," initially recorded for Ladies Night, and "Right Now 2004," a re-recording of their debut single, were released as double single on 29 March 2004.

Critical reception

AllMusic editor Andy Kellman wrote that "a European release, Greatest Hits should provide just about anyone with all the Atomic Kitten that's necessary [...] It touches on each of the group's studio albums with a strong emphasis placed on the single [...] Why the US powers that be never gave this group (and Sugababes) more of a chance is anyone's guess." Annabel Leathes from BBC Music felt that "if this hits collection is to be their parting gift, then weeping fans will not be disappointed. The album features fifteen tracks from the felines, most of which are a fair representation of the Kittens' consistent chart success."

Chart performance
The Greatest Hits debuted and peaked at number five on the UK Albums Chart in the week of 11 April 2004. This marked the band's fourth consecutive top five album in the United Kingdom. It was certified Silver by the British Phonographic Industry (BPI) on 16 April 2004 for domestic shipments in excess of 60,000 copies and ranked 126th on the UK Albums year-end chart. The Greatest Hits also reached top ten in Scotland and New Zealand where it peaked at number four and eight, respectively, and reached the top 20 in Ireland and the top in Austria.

Track listing

Notes
 denotes co-producer
 denotes additional producer
Kerry Katona's vocals appear on "I Want Your Love" and "See Ya", while Frost's vocals appear on "Whole Again", which Katona originally featured on.
Sample credits
"Be with You" contains a sample from "Last Train to London" performed by Electric Light Orchestra.

Charts

Weekly charts

Year-end charts

Certifications

Release history

References

2004 greatest hits albums
Atomic Kitten albums